Winston Chitando is a Zimbabwean politician.

Career
In December 2017 was appointed the country's Minister of Mines and Mining Development. He is a member of Zanu-PF and is the member of parliament for Gutu Central. He was ordered imprisoned in February 2020 for contempt of court for failing to transfer ownership over mining claims.

Prior to becoming a politician, he led mine operations at Mimosa Holdings and Hwange Colliery Company Limited.

Winston Chitando is the son of Nyengeterai Chitando and David Kwangware Gwatima Chitando.

References

Year of birth missing (living people)
Living people
ZANU–PF politicians